The 1969 Sacramento State Hornets football team represented Sacramento State College—now known as California State University, Sacramento—as a member of the Far Western Conference (FWC) during the 1969 NCAA College Division football season. Led by ninth-year head coach Ray Clemons, Sacramento State compiled an overall record of 8–2  with a mark of 4–1 in conference play, placing second in the FWC. The team finished the season ranked No. 12 in the College Division AP Poll and outscored its opponents 279 to 140 for the season. The Hornets played home games at Hornet Stadium in Sacramento, California.

Schedule

Team players in the NFL
The following Sacramento State players were selected in the 1970 NFL Draft.

References

Sacramento State
Sacramento State Hornets football seasons
Sacramento State Hornets football